Global Academy of Technology (GAT) is an Autonomous engineering and management college in Bangalore, Karnataka. It was established in the year 2001. The campus has more than 3000+ students and 300 faculty and staff.

It is managed by Karnataka Pradesh Congress Committee office bearer D.K. Shivakumar.

History
The National Education Foundation (NEF) was established in the year 2000, in Bangalore, the IT capital of India. The primary focus of the Foundation is to cater to students of all strata across the country, starting from Primary to Post Graduate Education in all disciplines. NEF has a broad spread of educational institutions — National Hill View Public School (NHVPS), Global College of Nursing (GCN) and Global Academy of Technology (GAT) offering Engineering, Postgraduate MBA, M.Tech., M.Sc. Engg. and Ph.D. programs

Campus
The Global Academy of Technology, has a green  10 acre campus located in Rajarajeshwari Nagar. GAT has a contemporary multimedia smart class rooms, modern laboratories seminar halls, Auditorium an up-to date library with volumes of recommended and reference books along with e-journals and well equipped computer centres. GAT provides 24 x 7 high-speed Wi-Fi facilities and web based CMS for video streaming which is an integral part of learning. A separate maintenance team is available in the campus to ensure perfect ambience for academics.

Academics

Under Graduate Courses(UG)
Global Academy of Technology offers Bachelor of Engineering (B.E) programs at the Under Graduate level. The Program spans over 4 years and is offered in 8 different branches. The Course structure is designed by the faculty of the college with the consultation of the faculty at VTU and IISc.

GAT offers courses in the following branches:
 Computer Science and Engineering
 Information Science and Engineering
 Civil engineering
 Electronics and Communication Engineering
 Mechanical Engineering
 Electrical and Electronics Engineering
 Artificial Intelligence & Data Science
 Artificial Intelligence & Machine Learning
 Aeronautical Engineering
 Bachelor of Science (honours)

Post Graduate Courses(PG)
Master of Technology

The Institute offers 2-year Master of Technology (M.Tech) in the following branches:
 Computer Science and Engineering
 Structural engineering
 Thermal Engineering
 Digital Electronics & Communication

Master of Science

The Institute offers 2-year Master of Science (M.Sc) in the following branches:
 Civil engineering
 Thermal Engineering

MBA

GAT also offers 2-year Master of Business Administration program.

Established in the year 2004 with an intake of 60, the Department caters to the current intake of 120 in the areas of Marketing, Finance and Human Resource Management.

Research Facilities
Global Academy of Technology has a Research and Consultancy Centre.

Research Areas@GAT:
Water Resources Engineering, Engineering Geology and Hydrogeology
Remote Sensing, Geographic Information Systems and Geophysical Investigations & Advanced Engineering Surveying
Alternate & Green Energy Sources
Hydroelectric projects, Tunneling and Environmental Impact Assessment
Material characterization, Thermal Management and Tribological studies of Composites
Machine Learning and Artificial Intelligence
Web Enabled IT Services
UWB Antenna Communication and RFID applications
Image Processing
Wholesale, Retail and Rural Marketing

Students Corner

Student Clubs
Every department has its own student club to host activities related to the domain in addition to hosting interdepartmental competitions and institution level competitions. Some the student clubs are:
IT-VIRTUOSO — Dept of CSE
INSPIRE — Dept of ISE
HYSTERESIS — Dept of EEE
RESONANCE -Dept of ECE
The CSE student club - IT-Virtuoso is the oldest and is the largest student club in the institution, which conducts the activities such as computer programming, gaming, paper presentations, quiz etc. by students and for students. As part of the IT-club activity, monthly e-newsletter and bi-monthly e-magazine released and hosted on the college web-site for the benefit of students at large.

Sports
Cricket Field, Basket Ball Court, Volley Ball Court and Tennis Courts are sports facilities.

Gallery

References

Affiliates of Visvesvaraya Technological University
Engineering colleges in Bangalore